Nikolskoye is a rural locality (a selo) and the administrative center of Nikolsky Selsoviet of Yenotayevsky District, Astrakhan Oblast, Russia. The population was 5,234 as of 2010. There are 62 streets.

Geography 
Nikolskoye is located 82 km northwest of Yenotayevka (the district's administrative centre) by road. Grachi is the nearest rural locality.

References 

Rural localities in Yenotayevsky District